Giacomo Poluzzi (born 25 February 1988) is an Italian professional footballer who plays as a goalkeeper for the Serie B club Südtirol.

Club career
He made his professional debut in the Lega Pro for Alessandria on 23 January 2015 in a game against Novara.

On 15 July 2015, he signed a one-year deal with Fidelis Andria. In January 2016, he extended his contract with Andria until 2017.

On 18 September 2019, he joined Serie C club Virtus Francavilla.

On 12 August 2020 he joined Südtirol.

References

External links
 
 

1988 births
Living people
Footballers from Bologna
Italian footballers
Association football goalkeepers
Serie A players
Serie B players
Serie C players
Serie D players
A.C. Carpi players
A.C. Giacomense players
A.C. Este players
U.S. Alessandria Calcio 1912 players
S.S. Fidelis Andria 1928 players
S.P.A.L. players
Virtus Francavilla Calcio players
F.C. Südtirol players